German submarine U-25 was one of two Type IA ocean-going submarines produced by Nazi Germany's Kriegsmarine. Constructed by DeSchiMAG AG Weser in Bremen as yard number 903, U-25 was commissioned  on 6 April 1936. It experienced a short, but successful combat career, sinking eight ships and damaging one.

Service history

Until 1940, U-25 was primarily used as a training vessel. During its trials it was found that the Type IA submarine was difficult to handle due to its poor stability and slow dive rate. In early 1940, the boat was called into combat duty due to the shortage of available submarines. U-25 participated in five war patrols, sinking eight ships and badly damaging one.

On 17 January 1940, 10 miles north of Shetland, U-25 torpedoed . Enid (Captain Wibe), of then-neutral Norway en route to Dublin, went to assist Polzella. U-25 then shelled and sank Enid. Her crew escaped in their lifeboats. None of Polzellas crew survived.

Fate
Around 2 August 1940, while on a mine-laying mission near Norway, U-25 passed through British minefield Field No. 7, striking a mine. The boat sank, taking all 49 hands with it.

Wolfpacks
U-25 took part in one wolfpack, namely:
 Prien (12 – 17 June 1940)

Summary of raiding history

References

Notes

Citations

Bibliography

External links

German Type I submarines
U-boats commissioned in 1936
U-boats sunk in 1940
World War II submarines of Germany
World War II shipwrecks in the North Sea
1936 ships
U-boats sunk by mines
Ships built in Bremen (state)
Military units and formations of Nazi Germany in the Spanish Civil War
Maritime incidents in August 1940